Andrew Trent Hayes (born September 3, 1987) is an American former professional baseball pitcher who played in Major League Baseball (MLB) for the Cincinnati Reds in 2016.

Amateur career
Prior to playing professionally, he attended McKenzie High School in McKenzie, Tennessee, when he was drafted in the 29th round of the 2006 Major League Baseball Draft by the Arizona Diamondbacks, a few picks ahead of outfielder Khris Davis. He did not sign a contract.

He initially attended Bethel College before transferring to Vanderbilt University, where he played three seasons. In his first season there, 2008, he was 2-1 with a 3.51 ERA in 21 games (three starts). In 2009, he was 4-3 with a 5.56 ERA in 18 games (six starts), while averaging more than a strikeout an inning for the second straight season. He also went 3-0 with a 1.25 ERA in 10 games for the Yarmouth-Dennis Red Sox of the Cape Cod Baseball League. The Seattle Mariners took him in the 22nd round of the 2009 Major League Baseball Draft, but again he did not sign a contract. Back with Vanderbilt in 2010, he was 6-0 with a 3.91 ERA 24 games (five starts). He was listed among the best draft prospects from Tennessee that year. The Reds drafted him in the 11th round of that year's draft and he inked a contract.

Professional career

Minor leagues
He pitched for the Billings Mustangs in 2010, appearing in 14 games and going 1-3 with a 2.42 ERA. In 2011, he was 2-2 with 22 saves and a 1.35 ERA in 51 games for the Dayton Dragons, striking out 89 batters and allowing only 29 hits in 60 frames. MLB.com named him the Class A Relief Pitcher of the Year and MiLB.com named him an Organization All-Star. He was also a Midwest League Post-Season All-Star. With the Pensacola Blue Wahoos in 2012, he was 2-3 with a 3.41 ERA in 56 games. In 2013, he posted a 5.43 ERA and allowed 73 hits in 63 innings with the Blue Wahoos. He played in the Arizona Fall League in both 2012 and 2013. He spent 2014 with Pensacola and was 5-3 with a 4.06 ERA in 52 games, again averaging more than a strikeout per inning. For the fourth year in a row, he was with Pensacola to start 2015, but was promoted to the Louisville Bats partway through the campaign.

In 2013, he was named among the Reds' best prospects by John Sickels. He has appeared at spring training with the major league club each year since 2012.

Cincinnati Reds
Hayes was called by the Reds on April 20, 2016. To make room for Hayes on the 40-man roster, the Reds designated right-hander Keyvius Sampson for assignment. Sampson was optioned to Triple-A Louisville on April 16. He made his Major League debut versus the Chicago Cubs on April 21, 2016.

Southern Maryland Blue Crabs
On May 13, 2017, Hayes signed with the Southern Maryland Blue Crabs of the Atlantic League of Professional Baseball. He became a free agent after the 2017 season.

References

External links

1987 births
Living people
Baseball players from Tennessee
Major League Baseball pitchers
Cincinnati Reds players
Vanderbilt Commodores baseball players
Yarmouth–Dennis Red Sox players
Billings Mustangs players
Dayton Dragons players
Pensacola Blue Wahoos players
Peoria Javelinas players
Glendale Desert Dogs players
Estrellas Orientales players
American expatriate baseball players in the Dominican Republic
Louisville Bats players
southern Maryland Blue Crabs players
People from McKenzie, Tennessee